Cotton Spinners' and Manufacturers' Association was, as its name suggests an employers organisation.  It was active in Lancashire from 1908 to 1961

References

Technology trade associations